Ráv Thomas is a solo singer-songwriter from Launceston, Australia. In 2009 Ráv Thomas toured Australia extensively performing with multi ARIA award winner Vanessa Amorosi, Evermore, Thirsty Merc, Kate Ceberano, Jimmy Barnes, Mental As Anything, Diesel, Toni Childs, James Reyne.

In August 2009, Thomas charted consecutively and later peaked at number 2 on the ARIA singles charts with debut EP Lily which also reached number 2 on the AMO (Australian Music Office)and number 2 on the AIR Charts (Australian Independent Record Labels Association).

In 2010, Thomas released Like a Game Show Host which was recorded at Woodstock Studios and produced by ARIA nominated Record producer, engineer Robin Mai (John Butler, Augie March, Jet, The Temper Trap.) 
The lead single Like A Game Show Host later charted at no 1 on the ARIA physical singles charts.

History

Early years 
In the early years Ráv Thomas grew up playing piano and began singing to audiences while still a child. He first started writing original music from the age of 7 in his hometown of Launceston, Tasmania.

He played piano through primary school, and by the time he reached high school in Launceston he was proficiently playing guitar and later formed his first rock band.

Name 
Ráv's first name is (pronounced "Rarv") – is short for Ravi – the acute accent (Á) changes the ‘a’ sound to ‘ah’ or ‘ar’.

Discography

Singles

See also 

 Music of Australia

Sources 
 ARIA
 ARIA
 Myspace
 CMI
 Robin Mai
 ARIA
 Newswire
 Auspop
 Auspop
 Flop of the Pops
 What News

References 

Musical groups established in 1998
Australian alternative rock musicians
Living people
Year of birth missing (living people)
Musicians from Tasmania
People from Launceston, Tasmania